Keith Wayne (January 16, 1945 – September 9, 1995), born Ronald Keith Hartman, was an American actor known for his only role as Tom in the George A. Romero's cult film Night of the Living Dead (1968).

Early life
Keith was born in Washington, Pennsylvania. His father was Vincent W. Hartman. His mother was Margaret Warga Hartman; she was a member of the First United Methodist Church of Houston and the Order of the Eastern Star, 97 Chartiers Chapter. In 1962, he graduated from Chartiers-Houston High School. He graduated from Mansfield State College in Mansfield, Pennsylvania, where he majored in music and was a fixture in university theatrical productions. During his college career he led a popular dance band called Ronnie and the Jestors.

Career
Wayne appeared in only one film, George A. Romero's 1968 horror classic Night of the Living Dead. Following the completion of the film, he worked as a singer for a number of years with The Bill Roberts Show, Keith Wayne and the Unyted Brass Works and others. In the early 1980s he became a chiropractor. He wrote a column for a number of years called Chiropractic Corner in Hardgainer magazine under the name of "Dr. R. Keith Hartman". Wayne's last paper was a work called How to Find Chiropractic Help, Bursitis and Tendinitis, Sternum Noises, Knee and Neck Care; plus the Notice of the Death of Dr. Hartman

Death
Wayne died by suicide on September 9, 1995.

Filmography

References

External links

1945 births
1995 deaths
Male actors from Pittsburgh
American male film actors
Mansfield University of Pennsylvania alumni
Suicides in North Carolina
20th-century American male actors
1995 suicides